The Assam Legislative Council was the unicameral legislature of Assam in India from 1913 to 1935 and then the upper house of the bicameral legislature from 1935 to 1947, when it was disbanded by the India (Provincial Legislatures) Order, 1947, and the Assam Legislative Assembly became unicameral.

References

State upper houses in India
Defunct upper houses in India